As shown in the table below, Qt has a range of bindings for various languages that implement some or all of its feature set.

See also 
 List of language bindings for Qt 5
 List of language bindings for GTK+
 List of language bindings for wxWidgets

References 

Qt (software)